Jason Herbison (born 1972) is an Australian television producer, screenwriter and novelist, most recently serving as the executive producer of the soap opera Neighbours. He has written scripts for numerous television serials, and has published several novels.

Career
After leaving high school, Herbison was hired to work in the series Neighbours for the writing room. He has also been part of the writing team of fellow soap opera Home and Away. For 15 years, Herbison worked for British soap opera magazine Inside Soap as its Australian correspondent. He also continued working on various serial dramas, recalling "It was a lot of juggling. At one stage, I had the back half of my house in Sydney set up as a photo studio, and had soap stars coming and going all the time. I was in my late 20s, so it was a very social environment, and I got all the gossip – which I loved. Most actors were terrific fun and some very naughty!" He took over the role of producer on Neighbours from Alan Hardy in 2013. On 4 December 2013, it was confirmed that Herbison had been promoted to series producer, succeeding Richard Jasek.

Herbison created the 2021 miniseries Lie With Me starring Brett Tucker and Charlie Brooks. The series was commissioned by Network 10 in Australia and Channel 5 in the UK. It was filmed in Melbourne. Following the success of Lie With Me, Herbison created and co-wrote two further dramas Riptide and Heat for Network 10 and Channel 5.

Select TV credits
Neighbours (1990–92, 1998–2002, 2010–11, 2012–) – writer, storyliner, script producer, producer, series producer, executive producer
Shortland Street (1991, 2010) – writer
Paradise Beach (1993–1994) – writer
Home and Away (1995, 2004–2008, 2012) – writer, script editor
Flipper (1995)
Echo Point (1995)
Pacific Drive (1996) – writer
Breakers (1998–1999) – writer
Above the Law (2000) – writer
Always Greener (2001–2003) – writer
Out of the Blue (2008) – script producer, writer
Rescue Special Ops (2009) – writer, story producer
Lie With Me (2021) – writer, executive producer
Riptide (2022) – writer
Heat (2023) – writer

Novels
And the Winner Is (1996)
The Big Break (1996)
Bondi Parade (1998)
Chart Sensation (1998)
The Cruellest Cut (1996)
Money Talks (1998)
The Price of Fame (1998)

References

External links

Jason Herbison at AustLit

Australian screenwriters
Australian male novelists
Living people
Place of birth missing (living people)
1972 births